François Haverschmidt (21 June 1906 – 28 April 1987) was a Dutch judge who served in Suriname who also took an interest in birds, writing a major work The Birds of Surinam (1968).

Haverschmidt was born in Utrecht to François and Catharina Jacoba Johanna Verbroeck. His grandfather François Haverschmidt wrote under the pseudonym Piet Paaltjens. As a young boy he was part of a birdwatchers group along with his friend Jan Verwey (1899-1981).

Haverschmidt studied law in the University of Utrecht and worked as a clerk in the courts of Utrecht, Haarlem (1936-1938), Heerlen (1938-1941) and Leeuwarden (1941-1946) before moving to Paramaribo, Suriname as a judge. While serving in Suriname, he found that despite work done by the Penard brothers and Charles Chubb, there were great gaps in knowledge. So he began to make collections and sent them to museums, initially to John Todd Zimmer at the American Museum of Natural History but after Zimmer's death in 1957, he sent specimens to Rijksmuseum van Natuurlijke Historie in Leiden. He sent nearly 9800 specimens over his lifetime. He also began to put together his notes and this resulted in the 1968 book, The Birds of Surinam with art by Paul Barruel. It was revised by Gerlof Fokko Mees in 1994.

Haverschmidt became chief justice of the Supreme Court and served as interim governor of Suriname on three occasions. For his service he was made Knight of the Order of the Netherlands Lion and Officer of the Order of Orange-Nassau.

References 

1906 births
1987 deaths
Dutch ornithologists
Knights of the Order of the Netherlands Lion
Officers of the Order of Orange-Nassau
Surinamese judges
20th-century Dutch judges